Gleneagles Hospital is a hospital in Singapore.

Gleneagles Hospital may also be referred to other similarly named hospitals established under the Gleneagles brand that IHH Healthcare and its subsidiary, Parkway Pantai manage:

 Hong Kong - Gleneagles Hospital Hong Kong

 India - Gleneagles Global Hospitals
 Malaysia
 Gleneagles Hospital Kota Kinabalu
 Gleneagles Hospital Kuala Lumpur
 Gleneagles Hospital Penang